The 2017 Taça de Portugal Final was the last match of the 2016–17 Taça de Portugal, which decided the winner of the 77th season of the Taça de Portugal. It was played on 28 May 2017 at the Estádio Nacional in Oeiras, between Benfica and Vitória de Guimarães.

Benfica won the Portuguese Cup for a record 26th time and made its 11th double (record – previously in 2014) by also winning the League.

Vitória de Guimarães qualified for the 2017–18 UEFA Europa League by reaching the final, as Benfica had already qualified for the UEFA Champions League via their league result. As Benfica won the 2016–17 Primeira Liga, Vitória de Guimarães will play against them in the 2017 Supertaça Cândido de Oliveira as the Taça de Portugal representative.

Broadcasting
The final was broadcast in Portugal on television by RTP (on RTP1), who holds the rights for several Portuguese Football Federation properties (which includes the Taça de Portugal final, the Supertaça Cândido de Oliveira and the Portugal national football team exhibition matches), and by SportTV (on SportTV 1) who holds the rights to broadcast the whole Taça de Portugal. RTP also broadcast the match worldwide, on RTP Internacional and on Portuguese-speaking Africa on RTP África.

Final

References

2017
2016–17 in Portuguese football
S.L. Benfica matches
Vitória S.C. matches
May 2017 sports events in Europe